John Frederick Bowman (September 28, 1957 – December 28, 2021) was an American television writer and producer. He wrote for Saturday Night Live, The Show, and In Living Color. He also co-created the hit series Martin, and worked as the showrunner of Murphy Brown. Bowman won a Primetime Emmy Award for Saturday Night Live in 1989. He nominated for two more, for In Living Color, in 1991 and 1992.

Early life and career
Bowman was born on September 28, 1957, in Milwaukee, Wisconsin. He attended Whitefish Bay High School. While attending Harvard College, he was an editor of The Harvard Lampoon. After graduating from Harvard Business School in 1985, he worked as a junior executive at PepsiCo. In 1988, he and his wife, Shannon Gaughan, were hired as staff writers on Saturday Night Live.

Bowman served as head of the Writers Guild of America negotiating committee during the 2007–08 writers' strike. He later taught comedy writing at the USC School of Cinematic Arts.

Personal life and death
Bowman married Shannon Gaughan in 1982. They met while working on The Harvard Lampoon. They had five children.

He died from dilated cardiomyopathy on December 28, 2021, at his home in Santa Monica, California, at the age of 64.

References

External links

1957 births
2021 deaths
20th-century American male writers
20th-century American screenwriters
21st-century American male writers
21st-century American screenwriters
American comedy writers
American male screenwriters
American male television writers
American television producers
American television writers
Deaths from cardiomyopathy
Harvard Business School alumni
Harvard College alumni
The Harvard Lampoon alumni
PepsiCo people
Primetime Emmy Award winners
Screenwriters from Wisconsin
Showrunners
USC School of Cinematic Arts faculty
Whitefish Bay High School alumni
Writers from Milwaukee